East Finchley Library is a grade II listed library at 226 High Road in East Finchley, London. It was built in 1938 to a design by Percival T. Harrison, the Borough of Finchley architect and engineer, assisted by C.M. Bond.

Gallery

References

External links

Buildings and structures in the London Borough of Barnet
Grade II listed library buildings
Grade II listed buildings in the London Borough of Barnet
Libraries in the London Borough of Barnet
Finchley